The Insurgents is the feature film debut of director Scott Dacko. It stars Mary Stuart Masterson, John Shea, Henry Simmons, Juliette Marquis and Michael Mosley. Shot on 24p, high-definition video in New York City in February 2006, the story revolves around four politically disillusioned Americans who build a truck bomb to spark a revolution.

In its world premiere at the 2006 Oldenburg International Film Festival, The Insurgents won the German Independence Audience Award for Best Picture. In its US premiere at the 2007 Palm Beach International Film Festival, The Insurgents won the Best Screenplay award. The Insurgents won Best Feature - Video at the 2007 Long Island International Film Expo.

References

Making an Indie Film by Cade Metz, PC Magazine, May 3, 2006.
Oldenburg International Film Festival web site

External links
 
 

2006 films
2000s thriller films
American political thriller films
Films scored by Mario Grigorov
2000s English-language films
2000s American films